Slavoljub Muslin (born 15 June 1953) is a Serbian football manager and former player.

Muslin began his head coaching career in 1988 and has since had stints in France, Morocco, Serbia, Bulgaria, Ukraine, Belgium, Cyprus, Belarus, Russia and Saudi Arabia. As a player, he played as a defender for several clubs, the most important being Red Star Belgrade and later Lille OSC.

Muslin qualified for the 2018 World Cup with the Serbian national team although he was sacked before the final tournament.

Playing career
Born to Croatian father Duje (from Split) and Serbian mother Danica (from Kragujevac), Slavoljub Muslin was born and raised in Belgrade, where he started playing football with OFK Beograd, continuing on in BASK, and FK Rad before transferring to Red Star Belgrade.

Muslin was a defensive stalwart for Red Star Belgrade in the 1970s. Throughout his six years at the Marakana he played alongside some of the club's biggest stars such as Dragan Džajić, Vladislav Bogićević, Jovan Aćimović, Vladimir Petrović and Dušan Savić. He won three championship titles with Red Star and finished as runner-up in the UEFA Cup in 1978-79 losing in the final to Borussia Mönchengladbach.

In 1981, he moved on to Lille OSC, then to Stade Brestois 29 and finished his playing career with SM Caen.

Coaching career

France and Morocco
Muslin began coaching in 1988 at the club where he spent some playing years earlier – Stade Brestois 29 – staying there until 1992. For the last two years of his tenure he had David Ginola in the squad.

Muslin spent the next three seasons at Pau FC before moving on to Girondins de Bordeaux in summer 1995. With a potent squad of quality up-and-coming players like Bixente Lizarazu, Christophe Dugarry as well as superstar-in-the-making Zinedine Zidane, Muslin led the team on a great run in the 1995–96 UEFA Cup ensuring progression to the quarterfinals before winter break 1995–96. He was sacked during spring 1996 due to poor domestic league form, which meant that he didn't get to lead the team in the UEFA Cup quarterfinals where the Girondins eliminated the favourites AC Milan and later made it to the final where they lost to a Bayern Munich team featuring the likes of Lothar Matthäus, Jürgen Klinsmann, Oliver Kahn, Markus Babbel, etc.

RC Lens became Muslin's home in the summer of 1996. He coached the team in 1996–97 season before getting the axe on 11 March 1997.

He went to Le Mans UC72 in the summer of 1997.

He changed clubs during the 1998–99 season, moving to coaching the Moroccan side Raja Casablanca.

Red Star, Levski, and Red Star again
Muslin took over the reigns of his old club Red Star Belgrade on 20 September 1999 in difficult circumstances after Miloljub Ostojić was sacked because of poor league form and a 1–0 first leg "home" loss (the match being played in Sofia due to an air traffic embargo imposed on FR Yugoslavia following the NATO bombing that ended a couple of months earlier) to Montpellier HSC in the UEFA Cup first round. Though he couldn't lead his squad past the French team in the second leg (his first match in charge), Muslin won the domestic double (league and cup) at the end of the season in impressive fashion.

He won the league again next season, but lost in the cup final to bitter rivals FK Partizan.

He resigned from his post on 30 September 2001, six weeks into the 2001–02 league season. The specific reason was never given, but it is widely believed it had to do with the ongoing simmering row with striker Mihajlo Pjanović that came to a head during the Champions League 3rd round qualifying tie when Muslin dropped the 24-year-old forward and Red Star ended up losing 0–3 to Bayer Leverkusen.

Muslin was not without a job for too long as in late March 2002 Levski Sofia sacked their coach Rüdiger Abramczik mid-season and offered the job to the Serbian who promptly steered the team to the league and cup double in May. He was sacked in April 2003 as Levski was trailing the leaders by 8 points in the domestic league. The team went on to win the National Cup under the management of Georgi Todorov.

In June 2003, Red Star came calling again after two seasons under coach Zoran Filipović. By the following spring Muslin brought his second domestic double to the club as a coach. The split from Red Star was again full of controversy. After winning the title, Muslin reportedly wanted more say in the club's transfer policy, essentially calling for his coaching role to be expanded into what club managers in England do. Red Star president Dragan Džajić would have none of it and a huge row erupted. At one point, Džajić – usually calm and collected – exploded in the media, calling Muslin a "piece of garbage."

Metalurh, Lokeren, Lokomotiv, and Lokeren again
The next stop for Muslin in summer 2004 became Ukraine's Metalurh Donetsk, which he coached fairly successfully for the better part of 2004–05 domestic league season. Simultaneously, Muslin also led the team in 2004/05 UEFA Cup – with much less distinguished outcome – after successfully overcoming the qualifying stage, Metalurh was demolished by SS Lazio (0-6 on aggregate). He resigned from his post on 8 March 2005, citing differences in opinion over the vision for the team's immediate future as the reason. His departure came after league matchday 17 with Metalurh occupying the 3rd spot in Vyscha Liha.

Then came Belgian side Lokeren between May and December 2005.

In December 2005, Muslin was appointed as coach of Lokomotiv Moscow. With star forward Dmitri Sychev as the team's undisputed leader on the pitch, Lokomotiv started the Russian League 2006 season in great fashion, jumping ahead early to the top of the table and going on an 18-match unbeaten streak at one point. Closely pursued by CSKA Moscow, Lokomotiv kept holding on to the top league spot until mid-October when a string of indifferent results saw them surrender it. Muslin was already under the gun following his team's elimination in UEFA Cup's first round to Belgian side S.V. Zulte Waregem, and after giving up the league leading position, he was promptly fired in October 2006.

On 26 November 2006, Muslin's return to Lokeren bench was announced. He arrived at the club in the middle of a bad run of results that prompted previous coach Ariël Jacobs' departure with Lokeren in 13th league spot. However, Muslin failed to raise the team's form and Lokeren barely avoided relegation, finishing the Belgian Jupiler League 2006/07 campaign in 16th spot (out of 18 teams). During the summer 2007, Muslin was replaced with Georges Leekens.

Khimki, Dinamo Minsk, and Anorthosis
On 7 September 2007, Muslin was announced as the new coach of FC Khimki. At the time of his arrival following matchday 23 of the 2007 season, the team was occupying 11th league spot, only three points out of the relegation zone. Under his guidance, Khimki finished the season in 9th spot, five points out of the relegation zone. In the 2008 season after matchday 5 Khimki occupied the 16th spot out of 16 after 0–4 defeat from Rubin Kazan. On 14 April 2008, Muslin was fired.

On 17 September 2008, he was named as the new head coach of Dinamo Minsk. But just ten months later on 27 July 2009 was fired again from the Belarusian club.

On 7 August 2009, he signed a contract with the Cypriot club Anorthosis Famagusta, a year after the team's appearance in the group stages of the UEFA Champions League 2008–2009. The Serbian replaced German coach Ernst Middendorp. He was released in 2010, due to the elimination of team in the quarterfinals of the cup, although the team was second in the Championship.

2010s–present
Muslin led FC Krasnodar from 2010 to 2013.

On 17 June 2014, Muslin was announced as the new head coach of FC Amkar Perm in Russian Football Premier League. But after the end of the first part of 2014-15 season, he was sacked for unsatisfactory results.

Muslin was announced as a new head coach of Standard Liège on 5 June 2015. His departure was announced on 28 August 2015.

Serbia
Muslin became Serbia manager on 5 May 2016. During his tenure, Serbia finished top of their 2018 World Cup qualifying group ahead of the Republic of Ireland, thus qualifying for a major competitive tournament after eight years. Despite this, he was sacked in October 2017.

Al-Fayha
Most recently, Muslin coached Al-Fayha of the Saudi Professional League.

Personal life
His son Marko is also a professional footballer.

Managerial statistics

Honours

Player
 UEFA Cup Runner-up: 1978–79
 Yugoslav First League (3): 1976–77, 1979–80, 1980–81
 Yugoslav Cup: 1965–66

Manager
 Botola: 1998–99
 First League of FR Yugoslavia (2): 1999–00, 2000–01
 First League of Serbia and Montenegro: 2003–04
 First Professional Football League: 2001–02
 FR Yugoslavia Cup: 1999–2000
 Serbia and Montenegro Cup: 2003–04
 Bulgarian Cup: 2001–02

References

External links

 

1953 births
Living people
Footballers from Belgrade
Serbian footballers
Yugoslav footballers
OFK Beograd players
Association football defenders
FK BASK players
FK Rad players
Red Star Belgrade footballers
Lille OSC players
Stade Brestois 29 players
Stade Malherbe Caen players
Yugoslav First League players
Ligue 1 players
Ukrainian Premier League managers
Serbian expatriate footballers
Expatriate footballers in France
Yugoslav football managers
Serbian football managers
Serbian expatriate football managers
FC Metalurh Donetsk managers
K.S.C. Lokeren Oost-Vlaanderen managers
FC Lokomotiv Moscow managers
FC Khimki managers
Russian Premier League managers
Serbian people of Croatian descent
Stade Brestois 29 managers
FC Girondins de Bordeaux managers
RC Lens managers
Red Star Belgrade managers
Le Mans FC managers
PFC Levski Sofia managers
Anorthosis Famagusta F.C. managers
Pau FC managers
FC Dinamo Minsk managers
Ligue 1 managers
FC Krasnodar managers
FC Amkar Perm managers
Standard Liège managers
Al-Fayha FC managers
Expatriate football managers in Belgium
Expatriate football managers in Bulgaria
Expatriate football managers in France
Expatriate football managers in Russia
Expatriate football managers in Belarus
Expatriate football managers in Cyprus
Expatriate football managers in Ukraine
Expatriate football managers in Saudi Arabia
Serbian expatriate sportspeople in Ukraine
Serbian expatriate sportspeople in Belgium
Serbian expatriate sportspeople in Bulgaria
Serbian expatriate sportspeople in France
Serbian expatriate sportspeople in Russia
Serbian expatriate sportspeople in Belarus
Serbian expatriate sportspeople in Cyprus
Serbia national football team managers
Saudi Professional League managers